Ira Remsen (February 10, 1846 – March 4, 1927) was an American chemist who discovered the artificial sweetener saccharin along with Constantin Fahlberg. He was the second president of Johns Hopkins University.

Early life

Ira Remsen was born in New York City on February 10, 1846. He is the son of James Vanderbelt Remsen (1818–1892) and Rosanna Secor (1823–1856). He married Elisabeth Hilleard Mallory on Apr 3, 1875, in New York City, New York. They had two children together. Their son, Ira Mallory Remsen (1876–1928), became a playwright living in Carmel-by-the-Sea, California. 

Remsen earned an M.D. from the New York Homeopathic Medical College in 1865. He subsequently studied chemistry in Germany, studying under chemist Wilhelm Rudolph Fittig, receiving a PhD from University of Göttingen in 1870.

Career
In 1872, after researching pure chemistry at University of Tübingen, Remsen returned to the United States and became a professor at Williams College, where he wrote the popular text Theoretical Chemistry. Remsen's book and reputation brought him to the attention of Daniel Coit Gilman, who invited him to become one of the original faculty of Johns Hopkins University. Remsen accepted and founded the department of chemistry there, overseeing his own laboratory. In 1879 Remsen founded the American Chemical Journal, which he edited for 35 years.

In 1879 Fahlberg, working with Remsen in a post-doctoral capacity, made an accidental discovery that changed Remsen's career.  Eating rolls at dinner after a long day in the lab researching coal tar derivatives, Fahlberg noticed that the rolls tasted initially sweet but then bitter. Since his wife tasted nothing strange about the rolls, Fahlberg tasted his fingers and noticed that the bitter taste was probably from one of the chemicals in his lab. The next day at his lab he tasted the chemicals that he had been working with the previous day and discovered that it was the oxidation of o-toluenesulfonamide he had tasted the previous evening. He named the substance saccharin and he and his research partner Remsen published their finding in 1880. Later Remsen became angry after Fahlberg, in patenting saccharin, claimed that he alone had discovered saccharin. Remsen had no interest in the commercial success of saccharin, from which Fahlberg profited, but he was incensed at the perceived dishonesty of not crediting him as the head of the laboratory.

Throughout his academic career, Remsen was known as an excellent teacher, rigorous in his expectations but patient with the beginner.  "His lectures to beginners were models of didactic exposition, and many of his graduate students owe much of their later success in their own lecture rooms to the pedagogical training received from attendance upon Remsen's lectures to freshmen."

He was elected as a member to the American Philosophical Society in 1879.

In 1901 Remsen was appointed the president of Johns Hopkins, where he proceeded to found a School of Engineering and helped establish the school as a research university. He introduced many of the German laboratory techniques he had learned and wrote several important chemistry textbooks. In 1912 he stepped down as president, due to ill health, and retired to Carmel, California.

In 1923 he was awarded the Priestley medal.

Death
He died on March 4, 1927, in Carmel-by-the-Sea, California. His ashes are interred behind a plaque in the chemistry building on the Homewood campus at Johns Hopkins University.

Legacy 
After his death, the new chemistry building, completed in 1924, was named after him at Johns Hopkins. His ashes are located behind a plaque in Remsen Hall; he is the only person buried on campus.

His Baltimore house was added to the National Register of Historic Places and declared a National Historic Landmark in 1975.

Remsen Hall in Queens College is also named for him.

Remsen Award 
In 1946, to commemorate the centenary of Remsen, the Maryland chapter of the American Chemical Society, began awarding the Remsen award, in his honor. Awardees are frequently of the highest caliber, and included a sequence of 16 Nobel laureates between 1950 and 1980.

Recipients

 1946: Roger Adams
 1947: Samuel C. Lind
 1948: Elmer V. McCollum
 1949: Joel H. Hildebrand
 1950: Edward C. Kendall 
 1951: Hugh Stott Taylor
 1952: W. Mansfield Clark
 1953: Edward L. Tatum 
 1954: Vincent du Vigneaud 
 1955: Willard F. Libby 
 1956: Farrington Daniels
 1957: Melvin Calvin 
 1958: Robert B. Woodward 
 1959: Edward Teller
 1960: Henry Eyring (chemist) 
 1961: Herbert C. Brown 
 1962: George Porter 
 1963: Harold C. Urey 
 1964: Paul Doughty Bartlett
 1965: James R. Arnold
 1966: Paul H. Emmett
 1967: Marshall W. Nirenberg 
 1968: Har Gobind Khorana
 1969: Albert L. Lehninger
 1970: George S. Hammond
 1971: George C. Pimentel 
 1972: Charles H. Townes 
 1973: Frank H. Westheimer
 1974: Elias J. Corey  
 1975: Henry Taube 
 1976: William N. Lipscomb, Jr. 
 1977: Ronald Breslow
 1978: John Charles Polanyi 
 1979: Harry B. Gray 
 1980: Roald Hoffman 
 1981: Koji Nakanishi
 1982: Harden McConnell 
 1983: George M. Whitesides
 1984: Earl L. Muetterties
 1985: Richard N. Zare
 1986: Gilbert Stork 
 1987: Stephen J. Lippard
 1988: Mildred Cohn
 1989: K. Barry Sharpless  
 1990: Robert G. Bergman 
 1991: Rudolph A. Marcus 
 1992: William Klemperer
 1993: Christopher T. Walsh
 1994: Edward I. Solomon
 1995: 
 1996: David A. Evans
 1997: William Hughes Miller
 1998: Peter Dervan
 1999: 
 2000: Alexander Pines 
 2001: Ad Bax
 2002: 
 2003: Henry F. Schaefer III
 2004: Samuel Danishefsky
 2005: Judith P. Klinman
 2006: Gabor A. Somorjai 
 2007: 
 2008: John C. Tully
 2009: Jean Frechet
 2010: John T. Groves
 2011: Graham R. Fleming
 2012: Daniel G. Nocera
 2013: Eric Jacobsen
 2014: Emily A. Carter
 2015: JoAnne Stubbe
 2016: Charles M. Lieber 
 2017: Robert H. Grubbs 
 2018: Chad Mirkin
 2019: Catherine J. Murphy
 2020: Tom W. Muir

References

Further reading

External links 

 Ira Remsen: The Chemistry was Right
 The History of African-Americans at The Johns Hopkins University.
 
 Papers of Ira Remsen

1846 births
1927 deaths
American chemists
Johns Hopkins University faculty
Presidents of Johns Hopkins University
People from Carmel-by-the-Sea, California
Presidents of the United States National Academy of Sciences
Columbia University Vagelos College of Physicians and Surgeons alumni